"High Wire" is a song by the Australian group Men at Work. The song was written by Men at Work singer/guitarist Colin Hay and the recording was produced by Peter McIan. It was released in November 1983 as the fourth and final single from their album Cargo.

The song reached No. 89 on the Australian Kent Music Report Singles Chart and No. 23 on the US Rock Tracks chart. AllMusic's Stephen Erlewine described it as a tight pop song.

Track listing

7" International version 
 "High Wire" (Colin Hay) – 3:02
 "I'd Like To" (Live) (Ron Strykert)

12" Australian version 
 "High Wire" (Colin Hay) – 3:02
 "Fallin' Down" (Live) (Jerry Speiser, Johnathan Rees)
 "I'd Like To" (Live) (Ron Strykert)

Personnel
Men at Work members
Greg Ham – keyboards, saxophone, backing vocal
Colin Hay –  guitar, lead vocal
John Rees – bass, backing vocal
Jerry Speiser – drums, backing vocal
Ron Strykert – guitar, backing vocal

Production details
Producer – Peter McLan
Engineers – Peter McLan, Paul Ray
Assistant Engineer – David PriceArt work'''
Photography – Greg Noakes
Artwork – Ron Strykert

Chart positions

References

1982 songs
1983 singles
Men at Work songs
Songs written by Colin Hay